ZScreen is a push-pull electro-optical liquid crystal modulator that is placed immediately in front of the projector lens or computer screen to alternately polarize the light from each video frame. It circularly polarizes the frames clockwise for the right eye and counterclockwise for the left eye.

The RealD 3D system now showing in theaters is using the ZScreen that was invented by Lenny Lipton.

See also
RealD Cinema
RealD
Lenny Lipton
StereoGraphics

Patents

External links 

 Dolby Digital 3D vs Real D / Master image systems Video Technology Blog
 Who is Lenny Lipton? About Inventor and Chief technical officer of RealD through 2008

3D imaging
3D cinema